Phycothais botanica is a species of sea snail, a marine gastropod mollusk in the family Muricidae, the murex snails or rock snails.

Description

Distribution
This marine species is endemic to Australia and occurs off New South Wales, Queensland, Tasmania and Victoria.

References

 Hedley, C. 1918. A checklist of the marine fauna of New South Wales. Part 1. Journal and Proceedings of the Royal Society of New South Wales 51: M1-M120.
 Angas, G.F. 1867. Descriptions of thirty-two new species of marine shells from the coast of New South Wales. Proceedings of the Zoological Society of London 1867: 110–117, pl. 13
 Tate, R. 1888. The gastropods of the older Tertiary of Australia. Part I. Transactions of the Royal Society of South Australia 10: 91–176

External links
  Tan K. S. (2003) Phylogenetic analysis and taxonomy of some southern Australian and New Zealand Muricidae (Mollusca: Neogastropoda). Journal of Natural History 37(8): 911–1028

Phycothais
Gastropods described in 1918